A prize of war is a piece of enemy property or land seized by a belligerent party during or after a war or battle, typically at sea. This term was used nearly exclusively in terms of captured ships during the 18th and 19th centuries.

Basis in international law
Rules defining how prizes were claimed and administered originated before there were organized government navies and were an outgrowth of privateering. Current international treaties provide for the retention of personal property by captured soldiers as well as issues of personal equipment in their possession when captured (including clothing, helmets, rank insignia and medals, and protective equipment such as gas masks), but excluding certain issue items such as weapons, horses, maps, and military documents. Non-personal equipment, vehicles, artillery pieces, ships, stockpiles of food and other material belongs to the capturing state and it may be used without any restriction.

Notable prize-takings

The 28th Virginia battle flag, from the American Civil War, is a Confederate battle flag that belonged to the 28th Virginia Infantry Regiment. Captured by the 1st Minnesota Infantry Regiment at the Battle of Gettysburg, the flag was brought to Minnesota and exhibited at the state's capitol for several years before passing into the permanent collection of the Minnesota Historical Society after 1896 where it has remained since. Although various groups in Virginia have requested that the flag be returned, beginning as early as 1960, Minnesota has repeatedly declined to return it, with Governor Jesse Ventura asking "Why? I mean, we won."

U-505 currently is a museum ship at the Museum of Science and Industry in Chicago.

The passenger ship , which had a notable role in the post-war history of the United Kingdom, was originally a German ship, confiscated after the war. The Russian ship , the largest traditional sailing vessel currently in operation, was originally the German ship Padua, before being taken over by the Soviet Union in 1946.  

Quantities of Iraqi military material captured during the Gulf War are held by US museums.

Material captured as a result of the Falklands War was reused by the British Armed Forces. This included two Agusta A109 helicopters captured by the British SAS from the Argentine Army, which were then used by the British Army Air Corps until 2007. Oerlikon GDF-002 AA guns and Skyguard FC radars were put into service by the Royal Auxiliary Air Force for some 10 years.

See also
List of ships captured in the 18th century
List of ships captured in the 19th century
Blockade runners of the American Civil War
Prize money
War looting
War trophy

References

Military law
Prize warfare